Henry Vernon Atherton (November 12, 1923 – March 1, 2016) was a Professor of Animal Science at the University of Vermont Extension, WWII veteran and pioneer in the dairy industry.

Early years
Born in Eden, Vermont on November 12, 1923, the third and youngest son of Phineas Alger Atherton (1907–1974) and Maude Lillian Marckres (1885–1980). His family were farmers in the Vermont dairy industry.

Atherton graduated from Barton Academy as class valedictorian in 1941; received a B.S. degree, cum laude, in dairy manufacturing in 1948, and an M.S. degree in 1950, both from the University of Vermont; and a PhD in dairy technology from Pennsylvania State University in 1953.

Career
Atherton became a pioneering investigator on the influence of bulk-milk cooling on the quality of milk and dairy products.

He is considered to be a leading researcher in a 100-year history of the American Dairy Science Association.
As a renowned dairy scientist, he promoted broader knowledge of cheeses consumed by American consumers.

Atherton was a founding member of the Dairy Practices Council, and president of the Vermont Dairy Industry Association, and served on several national boards in the dairy industry. He worked with the  Department of the Interior and the Environmental Protection Agency to establish farm water quality criteria.

Atherton was a professor of animal and dairy husbandry at the University of Vermont. He retired in 1989, and in 2010 he received the Sinclair Cup Award for lifetime achievement, and was elected to the Vermont Agricultural Hall of Fame.

The University of Vermont holds a historical account of his life and academic career, including audio interviews

Personal
Atherton married to Phyllis Marie Hardy (1924–2017), the daughter of Wayland and Alice Hardy, on August 24, 1947. They had 3 children; William, Larry and Robert Atherton. 11 grandchildren and 12 great-grandchildren.

He died in Burlington, Vermont on March 1, 2016.

References

1923 births
2016 deaths
American agriculturalists
Agriculture educators
American food scientists
Dairy educators
People from Eden, Vermont
Penn State College of Agricultural Sciences alumni
University of Vermont alumni
University of Vermont faculty
American military personnel of World War II